Dame Eileen Rosemary Mayo  (11 September 1906 – 4 January 1994) was an English artist and designer who worked in England, Australia and New Zealand in almost every available medium – drawings, woodcuts, lithographs on stone and tempera, tapestry and silk screening. In addition to being a printmaker, illustrator, calligrapher and muralist, she designed coins, stamps, tapestry and posters, and wrote and illustrated eight books on natural science.

Life in England
She was born in Norwich and educated in Yorkshire and the Clifton High School, Bristol. She had a thorough grounding in art, studying at the Slade School in London, the Central School of Arts and Crafts and under Henry Moore at the Chelsea Polytechnic.

In 1927 she was instructed in lino-cutting by Claude Flight over the telephone. Her resulting print was called "Turkish Bath", which was included in the Redfern Gallery's 'First Exhibition of British Linocuts'. The picture was subsequently bought by the Victoria and Albert Museum. In 1940 she moved to Paris to study with Fernand Léger at the Académie Montmartre.

She held teaching positions at Saint Martin's School of Art and Sir John Cass College in London. She became a member of the Society of Wood Engravers, and wrote and illustrated a series of books. She also exhibited at the Royal Academy summer exhibition and with the Royal Society of British Artists. For a time she worked as an artists' model, for Bernard Meninsky, Duncan Grant, Dod Procter and particularly Laura Knight.

Marriage
In 1936 she married Dr Richard Gainsborough, who founded Art News & Reviews; she designed the first issue when it appeared in 1949. The marriage ended in 1952.

Life in Australia
Mayo emigrated to Australia in 1952 after separating from her husband and became one of the many migrants who contributed to the postwar print revival. She taught at the National Art School in Sydney and was a member of Sydney Printmakers. Her career in Australia included working on murals and designing tapestries and posters.

Stamp design in Australia

As part of the Australian Commonwealth series of six postage stamps issued between 1959 and 1962 she designed the platypus for the one-shilling stamp and was awarded the Vizard-Wholohan Prize for prints in 1962. Other stamps in the series feature the kangaroo, banded anteater, tiger cat, rabbit bandicoot and the Tasmanian tiger (now believed extinct). This stamp series is significant as it was one of the earliest attempts at putting Australian flora and fauna on stamps. In addition it was one of the first times that a designer further commercialised their designs by producing poster versions of the stamp artwork and made them available for sale. This series, the first to be designed by a woman, were for the Postmaster-General's Department now called Australia Post. Mayo produced many stamp and poster designs depicting the flora and fauna of Australia.

Life in New Zealand
In 1962, she moved to Waimate, New Zealand, where her mother and sister had lived since 1921. By 1965 Mayo had moved to Christchurch, where she taught at the University of Canterbury (SFA) until 1972. For more than three years she also worked on an underwater diorama with Otago Museum. A founding member of Sydney Printmakers, she was on the Print Council of New Zealand. Apart from a period in Dunedin from 1972 to 1975, she remained in Christchurch until her death. Her last works were silkscreen prints, which she found the easiest medium to use with decreasing mobility, insisting, as always, that they be sold at affordable prices.

Stamp design in New Zealand
Mayo continued to design stamps in New Zealand, such as the 1969 Cook Bicentenary and 1971 Antarctic Treaty, and UNICEF commemoratives and six stamps of the 1970 moths and fish definitive series for the New Zealand Post Office.

Studied at institutions
 The Slade School of Fine Art, London (1924–25)
 Grosvenor School of Modern Art under Claude Flight
 Central School of Arts and Crafts, London under Noel Rooke and John Farleigh.
 Chelsea Polytechnic (1936), London
 Académie de Montmartre, Paris (1948–49) under Fernand Léger

Lectured at institutions
 Saint Martin's School of Art
 Sir John Cass College, London (1950–53)
 National Art School, Sydney (1957–62)
 School of Fine Art, University of Canterbury (from 1967)

Work at public collections in New Zealand
 Aigantighe Art Gallery
 Dowse Art Museum
 Dunedin Public Art Gallery
 Hocken Collections
 Manawatu Art Gallery
 Christchurch Art Gallery
 National Library of New Zealand
 Rotorua Museum of Art and History
 Museum of New Zealand Te Papa Tongarewa
 Alexander Turnbull Library

Book illustrations
Written and Illustrated by Eileen Mayo
 The Story of Living Things and Their Evolution
 Nature's ABC
 Little Animals of the Countryside
 Larger Animals of the Countryside
 Animals on the Farm
 Shells and How They Live
 Serge Lifar: Sixteen Drawings in Black and White
 The Story of Living Things and their Evolution

Illustrated by Eileen Mayo
 First French Course for Seniors
 Some Scottish Dances
 Best Cat Stories
 A Primer of Classical Ballet (Cecchetti Method) for Children
 A Second Primer of Classical Ballet (Cecchetti Method) for Children
 One Day on Beetle Rock
 Rational Limbering
 The Story of the World
 The Children's Circus Book
 Japanese Garland
 Toys
 The Poems of Amriolkais (Sir Williams Jones, translator)

List of works
Woman at a dressing table colour linoleum cut circa 1930
Works in the collection of the Christchurch Art Gallery

Damehood
Mayo was created a Dame Commander of the Order of the British Empire, for services to art, in the 1994 New Year Honours, one week before her death at the age of 87.

References

External links
Works and records related to Eileen Mayo in the collection of the Museum of New Zealand Te Papa Tongarewa
Christchurch Art Gallery
Tate Gallery, London - Curiously they have a lock of Eileen Mayo's hair
Cats in 20th Century Art - Eileen Mayo
Shifting boundaries: the art of Eileen Mayo 

1906 births
1994 deaths
20th-century British printmakers
20th-century English painters
20th-century English women artists
Academics of Saint Martin's School of Art
Alumni of the Central School of Art and Design
Alumni of the Grosvenor School of Modern Art
Alumni of the Slade School of Fine Art
Artists from Norwich
Australian stamp designers
British emigrants to New Zealand
English artists' models
English contemporary artists
English women painters
New Zealand Dames Commander of the Order of the British Empire
New Zealand printmakers
New Zealand stamp designers
New Zealand women painters
People educated at Clifton High School, Bristol
Academic staff of the University of Canterbury
Women graphic designers
Women printmakers
Women stamp designers